Matthew James (born December 5, 1991) is an American television personality, businessman, and former NCAA football player. James is best known for being the first male African-American lead for The Bachelor in season 25.

Early life and education
James was raised in Raleigh, North Carolina, the son of Manny and Patty James. Growing up, James was raised by his mother. He is biracial, having a Black Nigerian father and White American mother. James identifies as black. He graduated from Sanderson High School in 2010 before going to Wake Forest University. James obtained his Bachelor's degree in Economics from Wake Forest University in 2015 where he was also a wide receiver for Wake Forest Demon Deacons football team from 2011 to 2014.

Professional football 

He had mini-camp tryouts with the Carolina Panthers and New Orleans Saints of the National Football League in May and June 2015, but was not signed by either team.

Career
Before moving to New York City, James worked at PNC Bank in Pittsburgh, Pennsylvania. He works for CBRE Group, Inc., a commercial real estate company in New York City. James is also the founder of ABC Food Tours, a non-profit organization that educates children in underserved communities about food and exercise in New York City.

The Bachelor

James and The Bachelorette contestant Tyler Cameron, his friend and work colleague, played football at Wake Forest University together. Cameron's mother nominated James to be a contestant on The Bachelorette before she died. James was originally cast to be a contestant for season 16 of The Bachelorette, starring Clare Crawley, but after filming was delayed due to the impacts of the COVID-19 pandemic, he was instead selected to be the next Bachelor for season 25 of The Bachelor, becoming the first male African American lead in the franchise's history. He is the first Black Bachelor lead in the show's history. The season concluded with James choosing to pursue a relationship with 24-year-old graphic designer Rachael Kirkconnell.

Dancing with the Stars

In September 2021, James was announced as one of the celebrities competing on season 30 of Dancing with the Stars. He was partnered with Lindsay Arnold. They were eliminated on week 4, finishing in 12th place.

Personal life

As of March 2022, James is in a relationship with Rachael Kirkconnell, the woman he chose on The Bachelor. James is also a marathon runner and participated in the 2022 New York City Marathon.

Notes

References

External links

1991 births
Living people
People from Raleigh, North Carolina
Players of American football from North Carolina
American football wide receivers
Wake Forest Demon Deacons football players
Bachelor Nation contestants
African-American players of American football
21st-century American businesspeople
African-American businesspeople
American nonprofit businesspeople